Kanaklata Barua (Assamese: কনকলতা বৰুৱা; 22 December 1924 – 20 September 1942), also called Birbala and Shaheed (martyr), was an Indian independence activist and AISF leader who was shot dead by the Indian Imperial Police of the British Raj while leading a procession bearing the National Flag during the Quit India Movement of 1942.

Early life 

She was born on 22 December 1924. Unfortunately, she died on 20 September 1942. Barua was born in the Borangabari village of the undivided Darrang district of Assam as the daughter of Krishna Kanta and Karneshwari Barua. Her grandfather Ghana Kanta Barua was a famous hunter in Darrang. Her ancestors were from the Dolakasharia Barua kingdom (Chutia vassal chiefdom) of the erstwhile Ahom state who relinquished the Dolakasharia title and continued retaining the Barua title. Her mother died when she was only five and her father, who remarried, died when she reached thirteen. She went to school till class three but then dropped out to take care of her younger siblings.

Independence activism 
During the Quit India Movement Barua joined the Mrityu Bahini, a death squad comprising groups of youth from the Gohpur sub-division of Assam. On 20 September 1942, the Bahini decided she would hoist the national flag at the local police station. Barua led a procession of unarmed villagers to do so. The police under Rebati Mahan Som, the officer in charge of the police station, warned the procession of dire consequences if they proceeded with their plan. Even after the warning, the procession continued marching ahead when the police fired upon the procession. Barua was shot and the flag she was carrying with her was taken up by Mukunda Kakoti who too was shot at. Both Barua and Kakoti were killed in the police action. Barua was 17 years old at the time of her death.

Death and commemoration 
The Fast Patrol Vessel ICGS Kanak Lata Barua of the Indian Coast Guard, commissioned in 1997, is named after Barua. A life-size statue of her was unveiled at Gauripur in 2011. Her passionate speech before her death, remains a source of inspiration for many.

Popular culture 
Her story was retold in director Chandra Mudoi's film, Epaah Phulil Epaah Xoril. The Hindi version of the movie, titled Purab Ki Awaz, was also released to reach a wider audience.

See also 
 Pushpalata Das

References

Further reading 
 

 Saheed Kanaklata Barua, proud2bindian.in.
 Due recognition for Kanaklata, Mukunda sought , The Assam Tribune, 14 March 2012

1924 births
1942 deaths
People from Darrang district
Deaths by firearm in India
Indian women activists
Indian independence activists from Assam
Women Indian independence activists
Activists from Assam
Women from Assam
20th-century Indian women
20th-century Indian people
People from Sonitpur district